The 2020 Nepal floods were induced by heavy rains causing landslides and flash floods in western Nepal, and in particular Myagdi District. As of 24 June, Nepal's Ministry of Home Affairs reported 132 dead, 53 missing, and 128 injured in 445 flooding and landslide incidents. Aon reported 401 fatalities from the floods.

Following the floods, Nepal's water minister Barshaman Pun instructed his officials to raise flood mitigation in the Nepal-India Joint Committee on Inundation and Flood Management (JCIFM) forum.

The Kathmandu Post labelled the rainy season as one of the deadliest in recent memory, writing that the large losses are a result of failure by local and national government.

See also 
May 2012 Nepal floods
2019 Nepal floods
2021 Nepal floods
2020 South Asian floods

References 

Floods
2020
July 2020 events in Asia
June 2020 events in Asia
2020 floods in Asia
2020 disasters in Nepal